The People and University Library of the Republic of Srpska (NUBRS) (Serbian, Croatian, and Bosnian: Narodna i univerzitetska biblioteka Republike Srpske) is the national library of Republika Srpska, located in the city of Banja Luka.

History
The Committee for the establishment of the People Library came to conclusion that  the city of Banja Luka establishes People Library of King Peter I the Great Liberator  on 25 November 1935.

Management of the House of King Peter I provided the necessary premises for the library and the Ministry of Education has awarded a primary school teacher as a librarian; Royal Ban administration of Vrbas municipality in Banja Luka determined constant annual subsidy; association Prosvjeta and Serbian Reading Room in Banja Luka put on disposal a substantial number of his books, and in addition the books were given by Gymnasium High School in Banja Luka and some private owners.

The library had 6,000 books with its disposal.

Association Society was allowed to borrow books from Central Library in Sarajevo.

On 26.04.1936 at the premises of the House of King Peter the Great Liberator, in a very solemn manner National Library of King Peter the Great Liberator was opened. There was no public library t in the city of  Banja Luka till now, as well as throughout the provinces of Vrbas.

The smaller executive board was concerned for the establishment of these institutions and it was composed of members of the steering committee for the raising of the House of King Peter the Great Liberator, from the representatives of the Serbian Reading Room and secondary schools. Dr. Demetrius Zakic participated as the main representative of the Select Committee.

On 30 July 1980 the National Library changes name and becomes the National and University Library "Petar Kocic."  
In 1999 Government of the Republika Srpska declares the National and University Library of the Republic of Srpska "Petar Kocic".

In December 1999, the National and University Library of the Republic of Srpska "Petar Kocic" was renamed to the National and University Library of the Republic of Srpska.

See also
National and University Library of Bosnia and Herzegovina
University of Banja Luka

References

External links
www.nub.rs — National and University Library of the Republic of Srpska

Culture of Republika Srpska
Republika Srpska
Libraries established in 1936
University of Banja Luka
1936 establishments in Yugoslavia
Buildings and structures in Republika Srpska
Libraries in Bosnia and Herzegovina